This is a list of mountains or hills in Belgium in order of height:

 Signal de Botrange (694 m)
 Weißer Stein (693 m)
 Mont Rigi (681 m)
 Baraque Michel (674 m)
 Steling (658 m)
 Baraque de Fraiture (652 m)
 Massif de Saint-Hubert (589 m)
 Plateau de Recogne-Bastogne (569m)
 Col du Rosier (556 m)
 Spiebig (550 m)
 Schwirzbierg (516 m)
 Hochtumskopf (510 m)
 Côte de Stockeu (506 m)
 Croix Scaille (505 m)
 Vaalserberg (323 m)
 Côte de La Redoute (292 m)
 Croix de Charneux (269 m)
 Bovenste Bosch (235 m)
 Roche-aux-Faucons (220 m)
 Mur de Huy (204 m)
 Schaesberg (200 m)
 Col de Landelies (177 m)
 Col de la Flisme (171 m)
 La Jonquière (171 m)
 Les Gaudys (162 m)
 Sart des Roquettes (161 m)
 Mon Idée (159 m)
 Kemmelberg (159 m)
 Pottelberg (157 m)
 Charly des Bois (154 m)
 Côte de la Fontaine de Jouvence (154 m)
 Mont de Rhode (153 m)
 Mont Noir (152 m)
 Mont St-Aubert (149 m)
 Hoppeberg (148 m)
 Hotondberg (145 m)
 Mont-Saint-Aubert (145 m)
 Schapenberg (145 m)
 Mont de l'Enclus / Kluisberg (141 m)
 Baneberg (140 m)
 Côté de les Hauts (138 m)
 Vidaigneberg (136 m)
 Scherpenberg (135 m)
 Bourliquet (133 m)
 Côté du Hallembaye (133 m)
 Fortuinberg (133 m)
 Muziekberg (133 m)
 Kanarieberg (131 m)
 Rodeberg (129 m)
 Helling van Kraai (125 m)
 Galgenberg (123 m)
 Mont D'Ellezelles (122 m)
 Côte de Henripont (121 m)
 Montagne Saint-Pierre (120 m)
 Sieberg (120 m)
 Côte de la Croix-Martin (119 m)
 Boussée (118 m)
 Côté du Dieu des Monts (118 m)
 Monteberg (115 m)
 Kesterheuvel (112 m)
 La Potterée (110 m)
 Oudenberg (110 m)
 Côte de la Caillou qui Bique (106 m)
 Pellenberg (106 m)
 Côte d'Audregnies (105 m)
 Ganzenberg (105 m)
 Plachettes (105 m)
 Congoberg (100 m)
 Côté du Hrdumont (100 m)
 Côte de la Croix Jubaru (99 m)
 Côte de Boucquemont (97 m)
 Lettenberg (95 m)
 Grotenberge (88 m)
 Sulferberg (88 m)
 Boigneberg (83 m)
 Goeberg (83 m)
 Eikenberg (82 m)
 Edelareberg (80 m)
 Koppenberg (77 m)
 Wijngaardberg (72 m)
 Bolderberg (60 m)
 Kattenberg (60 m)
 Willekensberg (60 m)
 Beerzelberg (52 m)
 Wolvenberg (51 m)
 Balenberg (45 m)
 Hoge Blekker (35 m)

Belgium
Mountains
Bel